Francis Mougel (born 7 May 1960) is a French biathlete. He competed at the 1984 Winter Olympics and the 1988 Winter Olympics.

References

1960 births
Living people
French male biathletes
Olympic biathletes of France
Biathletes at the 1984 Winter Olympics
Biathletes at the 1988 Winter Olympics
Sportspeople from Vosges (department)